Vlakfontein is a small settlement in the Mpumalanga Province of South Africa. During the Second Boer War it was the site of a guerrilla action against the British forces where a Victoria Cross was awarded to William John English of the Scottish Horse for conspicuous gallantry.

References

Populated places in the Emakhazeni Local Municipality
Populated places founded by Afrikaners